Meitan Araba is a 2019 Indian Meitei language film directed by Lukanand Kshetrimayum and written by Sen Sagolsem. The film features Brahmacharimayum Dishiraj and Avi Khundrakpam in the lead roles. The film was certified in 2018 and released on 6 January 2019 at MSFDS (Manipur State Film Development Society), Palace Compound, Imphal. The film earned 11 nominations at the 8th SSS MANIFA 2019, winning 7 awards including the Best Feature Film Award.

Cast
 Brahmacharimayum Dishiraj
 Avi Khundrakpam
 Abenao Elangbam
 Idhou
 Longjam Ongbi Lalitabi
 Takhellambam Lokendra

Accolades
Meitan Araba won the Best Feature Film award and many other awards at the 8th Sahitya Seva Samiti Awards (SSS MANIFA) 2019.

References

2019 films
2010s Meitei-language films